is a private women's college in Chiyoda, Tokyo, Japan, established in 1949.

History
The vocational predecessor of the school was founded in 1886. The name "Kyoritsu", meaning "standing together" in Japanese, came from the fact that 34 people were involved in the foundation of the school; among them were educator Haruko Hatoyama, Kyuichiro Nagai (the father of writer Kafu Nagai), and educator Seiichi Tejima.

Mission
The founding of Kyoritsu marked the very beginning of women's higher education in Japan: To recognize the need to "educate modern women in knowledge and skills, and to elevate the position of women in society."

Facilities

Kyoritsu Kodo is the school's 2,010-capacity auditorium.  The auditorium has been used for concerts, hosting bands such as Free, James Gang and Yes.

Exchanges
The university has established exchanges and links with other international institutions of higher education—for example, the University of Pennsylvania

Notable associates

Faculty
Kaoru Hatoyama was a schoolmaster at the university founded by her mother-in-law, Haruko. (Kaoru was the wife of Ichirō Hatoyama, who was the 52nd, 53rd and 54th Prime Minister of Japan.)

Kyoritsu Girls' School alumni and a contemporary of Kaoru, Asa Matsuoka often lectured at the school in the 1930s and 1940s.

Alumni 
Noriko Iriyama, actress
Makiko Kuno, actress
Yoko Moriguchi, actress
Yuka Kuramochi, actress, gravure idol, and Internet personality

References

Notes
 Kobayashi, Kei, Tetsurō Kitamura, Noriyuki Ito and Maki Tamada. (1992). . Tokyo: Nihon Vogue.  OCLC 28872477

External links
 Official website 
 WikiMapia,  Kyoritsu-Kodo (Auditorium)

1949 establishments in Japan
Private universities and colleges in Japan
Universities and colleges in Tokyo
Women's universities and colleges in Japan